Belén López may refer to:

 Belén López (actress) (born 1970), Spanish actress
 Belén López (flamenco dancer) (born 1986), Spanish flamenco and classical dancer
 Belén López (cyclist) (born 1984), Spanish cyclist
 Belén López, a character from Spanish television series Aquí no hay quien viva
Belén López Peiró (born 1992), Argentine writer